Plan Galicia was an economic recovery plan of the Spanish government that took place in Galicia after the Prestige oil spill. It was adopted by the Spanish Council of Ministers on January 23, 2003, in an attempt to mitigate the consequences of the Prestige disaster. Plan Galicia was presented as complementary to the one approved days before by the Xunta de Galicia.

Economy of Galicia (Spain)